The Gentleman Usher to the Sword of State is an officer of the British Royal Household. He is responsible for bearing the Sword of State before the monarch on ceremonial occasions. However, the Gentleman Usher was removed from the procession at the State Opening of Parliament in 1998.

List of Gentlemen Ushers to the Sword of State
10 January 1837 – 1874?: Sir William Martins
vacant
23 July 1901 – 1 December 1915: Sir Spencer Ponsonby-Fane
27 June 1919 – 20 May 1924: Sir Edward Goschen, 1st Baronet
3 November 1924 – 1933: Sir Reginald Brade
10 March 1933 – 22 March 1946: Lieutenant General Sir Lewis Halliday
22 March 1946 – 4 November 1966: Air Chief Marshal Sir Arthur Barratt
3 February 1967 – 1973: General Sir William Stirling
26 October 1973 – 7 April 1980: Admiral Sir Desmond Dreyer
7 April 1980 – 2 May 1988: Air Chief Marshal Sir John Barraclough
2 May 1988 – 1997: General Sir Edward Burgess
1997 – 1 December 2005: Admiral Sir Michael Layard
1 December 2005 – ????: Air Chief Marshal Sir John Allison
2013 – present: General Sir Kevin O'Donoghue

See also
Gentleman Usher

References

Positions within the British Royal Household
Ceremonial officers in the United Kingdom